The 1982–83 Scottish First Division season was won by St Johnstone by one point over nearest rival Hearts. Both clubs were promoted to the Premier Division.

League table

Promotion

St Johnstone and Hearts finished 1st and second respectively and were promoted to the 1983–84 Scottish Premier Division.

Relegation

Dunfermline Athletic and Queen's Park finished 13th and 14th respectively and were relegated to the 1983–84 Scottish Second Division.

References

Scottish Football Archive

2
Scottish First Division seasons
Scot